The 2007 Groundhog Day tornado outbreak was a localized but devastating tornado event that took place in central Florida early on February 2, 2007. Early morning temperatures had risen well above average for the season; combined with increased moisture and a powerful jet stream, this created enough instability and wind shear for thunderstorms to rotate and spawn tornadoes. Due to the conditions, a long-tracked supercell formed and produced three tornadoes over one hour and seventeen minutes. The supercell resulted in a 70-mile (110-kilometer) trail of damage.

Twenty-one people were killed and 76 others were injured in the outbreak. The first tornado damaged 1,145 homes and destroyed 200 others in Sumter County before hitting the Lady Lake area where it killed eight people. A total of 180 homes were damaged and 101 homes were destroyed in Lake County. The second tornado killed 13 people in the Lake Mack area and damaged or destroyed over 500 homes and other structures during its existence, including the 1500-foot (450-meter) tall transmission tower of WCFB FM. The final tornado damaged roofs, car ports and garage doors along its path through New Smyrna Beach. The outbreak was the second-deadliest on record for Florida, with damages of $218 million.

Synopsis 

In east central Florida, a warm sector, a region of warm surface air between a cold front and a warm front, was positioned ahead of a progressing cold front. Large scale lift was supported by a very strong jet stream aloft, with strong vertical shear evident, conducive for rotating thunderstorms and tornadoes. Instability increased overnight with temperatures and dew points increasing through the pre-dawn hours. The conditions helped several thunderstorm cells to develop ahead of the cold front in a line, in the Gulf of Mexico. One of these thunderstorm cells matured into a supercell thunderstorm that remained intact, while other cells to its north failed to sustain themselves. The supercell had strong rotation visible on radar as it approached the western Florida Coast before it produced three tornadoes, two rated EF3 from Sumter County to the coastal waters of Volusia County during the early morning hours of February 2, 2007. After moving offshore, the main tornado-producing supercell quickly weakened and decayed into a bunch of showers, while another supercell produced an EF0 tornado four hours after the main supercell moved offshore.

At 3:06 am EST (0806 UTC), the National Weather Service (NWS) issued a tornado warning for northern Lake County until 4:00 am EST (0900 UTC). At 3:10 am EST (0810 UTC), the first tornado touched down near The Villages and traveled at  into Lake County. Five minutes after the tornado touched down, a severe weather update bulletin was issued by the NWS stating that there was a high likelihood of an extremely dangerous tornado and people in the path were in a life-threatening situation. Initially, the tornado was thought to have still been on the ground and a third bulletin was released at 3:34 am EST (0834 UTC).
 

The mesocyclone that produced the first tornado restrengthened and formed another tornado near Paisley at 3:37 am EST (0837 UTC) in Lake County. A second tornado warning was issued at 3:52 am EST (0852 UTC) for Volusia County as the tornado was tracking toward the area. It went east northeast toward the Lake Mack area, exceeding . A third tornado warning was issued in Volusia County at 4:13 am EST (0913 UTC), nearly ten minutes before the third tornado touched down. The supercell produced its last tornado east of I-95 at 4:22 am EST (0922 UTC) and dissipated five minutes later at the Intracoastal Waterway,  from where it touched down. The tornado had a maximum width of  around the time it reached peak intensity.

Confirmed tornadoes

February 2 event

Aftermath 

The outbreak was the second-deadliest on record for Florida, behind one that killed 42 people in February 1998. Damages from the tornado outbreak totaled $218 million (2007 US$). Christopher Patton, spokesman for the Lake County emergency operations center, described the damage as "unlike even perhaps the hurricanes of 2004 when we had minor roof damage, screen damage, pool damage. This is way far more devastating." The tornadoes were the first to be rated on the Enhanced Fujita Scale, which replaced the original Fujita Scale.

U.S. President George W. Bush signed a declaration to designate Sumter, Lake, Volusia and Seminole counties as disaster areas. A state of emergency was declared by Governor Charlie Crist for the same counties. More than 400 American Red Cross volunteers from across several states went to help in central Florida. The Tampa Bay chapter of the American Red Cross sent six volunteers with emergency response vehicles to the main area of damage. The Walt Disney Company donated $50,000 to the American Red Cross to help aid victims and Feed The Children sent two truckloads of relief supplies to the central Florida area. The Salvation Army brought several mobile kitchens to offer relief to victims and Verizon Wireless helped by offering citizens the use of a wireless emergency communication center, in addition to cleaning and repairing cellular phones damaged by the storms. Katie Couric anchored the CBS Evening News from Lady Lake on February 2. The broadcast was slated to be from Miami, where Super Bowl XLI was held two days later as the game was to air on CBS. A moment of silence was held before Super Bowl XLI in Miami to honor the victims of the tornadoes.

See also 
 List of North American tornadoes and tornado outbreaks
 1966 Tampa tornado family

Notes

References

External links 

 Special Report: The Central Florida Tornadoes: One Year Later from the St. Petersburg Times
 Special Report: Tornadoes Ravage Central Florida from the St. Petersburg Times
 Survey of Sumter County tornado
 Lady Lake tornado report

F3 tornadoes
Tornadoes of 2007
Tornadoes in Florida
Lake County, Florida
2007 natural disasters in the United States
2007 in Florida
February 2007 events in the United States